Edda Mukabagwiza (born 1968) is a Rwandan politician and former diplomat. Since 2013, she has been a member of the Chamber of Deputies in the Parliament of Rwanda.

Mukabagwiza previously held the role of Minister of Justice in the Government of Rwanda (2003–2006), and was High Commissioner and Ambassador of the Republic of Rwanda to Canada and Cuba (2007–2013).

She was first elected to the Chamber of Deputies in 2013, and was re-elected in 2018. She is a member of the RPF-Inkotanyi party. In 2018, the Chamber of Deputies elected her Deputy Speaker in charge of Government Oversight and Legislation.

References 

Living people
1968 births
Members of the Chamber of Deputies (Rwanda)